Salminus, popularly known as dorado or dourado, is a genus of relatively large (up to  long), predatory freshwater fish from the family Characidae. They are native to large tropical and subtropical rivers in South America, and undertake migrations during the rainy season to spawn. They are very popular among recreational anglers and also support important commercial fisheries.

Species
Significant taxonomic confusion has surrounded this genus, and until a review in 1990, several additional species were recognised (most of these are junior synonyms of S. brasiliensis). Although known for more than 150 years, S. franciscanus was only scientifically described in 2007. Today, four extant (living) species are recognised:

 Salminus affinis Steindachner, 1880 – Santiago and Magdalena basins in Ecuador and Colombia
 Salminus brasiliensis (G. Cuvier, 1816) (dorado/golden dorado) – Paraguay, Uruguay, Chapare and Mamoré basins, and drainage of the Lagoa dos Patos
 Salminus franciscanus F. C. T. Lima & Britski, 2007 – São Francisco basin
 Salminus hilarii Valenciennes, 1850 – upper Paraná, Amazon and Orinoco basins

A fifth extinct species is only known from Miocene fossil remains:
 †Salminus noriegai – Argentina

References

Characidae
Taxa_named_by_Louis_Agassiz
Fish of South America